Jusselle was an ancient broth-based soup dish prepared using grated bread, eggs, sage and saffron. The ingredients were all boiled together in the broth.

Origin
The dish is believed to have originated from the dish  in Ancient Roman cuisine, which was included in Apicius, a Roman recipe book that is believed to have been written in the late 4th or early 5th century. In Latin, juscellum or juscullum is "a diminutive from jus, broth or pottage", and is also a late Latin diminutive word for "soup". The Sicilian name for the dish  is based upon the word juscellum.

See also

 List of soups
 Roman cuisine

Notes

References

Ancient dishes
Roman cuisine